Franz Anton Dorotheus Cramer or François Cramer (12 June 17721 August 1848) was an English violinist and conductor who was Master of the King's/Queen's Musick from 1834 until his death.

He was born in either Mannheim or London, the son of Wilhelm Cramer and the brother of Johann Baptist Cramer.  He was no doubt his father's pupil.  Next to nothing seems to be known about his activities or compositions, yet he was appointed Master of the King's Musick in 1834, by King William IV, succeeding Christopher (or Christian) Kramer, who was no relation.

The king died in 1837, and Cramer continued as Master of the Queen's Musick to Queen Victoria.  He did not contribute any music to her coronation, leading The Spectator to complain that he had been allowed "to proclaim to the world his inability to discharge the first, and the most grateful duty of his office — the composition of a Coronation Anthem".

He died in 1848 aged 76, and was succeeded by George Frederick Anderson.

The only composition of Cramer's that has survived is a Capriccio (Album Leaf) for violin, which is in manuscript in the British Museum.

Sources

External links
 Grove's Dictionary of Music and Musicians, 5th ed. 1954
 Answers.com

1772 births
1848 deaths
English classical violinists
British male violinists
English composers
English conductors (music)
British male conductors (music)
English people of German descent
Masters of the Queen's Music
Masters of the King's Music
Male classical violinists